Kefalograviera (Greek: Κεφαλογραβιέρα) is a hard table cheese produced traditionally from sheep's milk or mixture of sheep's and goat's milk.  According to the PDO filing with the EU (see below) the name applies only to cheese produced in Western Macedonia, Epirus, and the regional units of Aetolia-Acarnania and Evrytania.  

The cheese has a salty flavour and rich aroma.  It is often used in a Greek dish called Saganaki, cut into triangular pieces, rolled in seasoned flour and lightly fried. It is an excellent cheese for grating, and is widely used as a topping for pasta dishes. According to one cookbook, "At its best, it is as good as or better than Romano or aged Asiago." It is very similar to Kefalotyri cheese and sometimes is sold under that name.

Kefalograviera has PDO status.

See also
 List of cheeses

References

Greek cheeses
Sheep's-milk cheeses
Greek products with protected designation of origin
Cheeses with designation of origin protected in the European Union
Greek Macedonian cuisine